Isognomonidae is a family of medium-sized to large saltwater clams. They are pearl oysters, marine bivalve molluscs in the superfamily Pterioidea

Genera
 Isognomon [Lightfoot], 1786 - tree oysters

References

 Bouchet P. & Rocroi J.P. (2010). Nomenclator of bivalve families; with a classification of bivalve families by R. Bieler, J.G. Carter & E.V. Coan. Malacologia. 52(2): 1-184
 Huber M. (2015). Compendium of Bivalves 2. Harxheim: ConchBooks. 907 pp.
 Coan, E. V.; Valentich-Scott, P. (2012). Bivalve seashells of tropical West America. Marine bivalve mollusks from Baja California to northern Peru. 2 vols, 1258 p.

External links
 Tëmkin I. (2010) Molecular phylogeny of pearl oysters and their relatives (Mollusca, Bivalvia, Pterioidea). BMC Evolutionary Biology 10: 342
 Combosch, D. J.; Collins, T. M.; Glover, E. A.; Graf, D. L.; Harper, E. M.; Healy, J. M.; Kawauchi, G. Y.; Lemer, S.; McIntyre, E.; Strong, E. E.; Taylor, J. D.; Zardus, J. D.; Mikkelsen, P. M.; Giribet, G.; Bieler, R. (2017). A family-level Tree of Life for bivalves based on a Sanger-sequencing approach. Molecular Phylogenetics and Evolution. 107: 191-208
 subaki, R., Kameda, Y., Kato M. (2011). Pattern and process of diversification in an ecologically diverse epifaunal bivalve group Pterioidea (Pteriomorphia, Bivalvia). Molecular Phylogenetics and Evolution. 58: 97–104.

Bivalve families
Pteriida